Alfred Johan "Alpo" Asikainen (2 November 1888 – 7 January 1942) was a Finnish wrestler who competed in the 1912 Summer Olympics, winning the bronze medal.

Sporting career
Asikainen won the Greco-Roman middleweight event at the 1911 World Wrestling Championships in Helsinki. It was the only time he finished within the podium at a World Wrestling Championship.

At the 1912 Olympics Asikainen won against his first four opponents, including the eventual winner Claes Johanson. In the semifinal he wrestled Estonian Martin Klein, who was forced to represent Russia, for eleven hours and forty minutes (time limits were introduced to wrestling in 1924) on a blisteringly sunny day outdoors in the Stockholm Olympic Stadium. After one hour, a short rest was granted, and then every thirty minutes.

Asikainen lost by pin, and Klein ended up withdrawing from the final due to exhaustion, resulting in Johansson winning the gold medal by default. Asikainen was awarded the bronze medal. The bout between Asikainen and Klein remains the longest wrestling match in history.

References
General

Specific

External links
 

1888 births
1942 deaths
Sportspeople from Vyborg
People from Viipuri Province (Grand Duchy of Finland)
Wrestlers at the 1912 Summer Olympics
Finnish male sport wrestlers
Olympic wrestlers of Finland
Olympic bronze medalists for Finland
Olympic medalists in wrestling
Medalists at the 1912 Summer Olympics
World Wrestling Championships medalists